The R193 road is a regional road in Ireland which links Rockcorry with the R190 regional road in County Monaghan.

See also 

 Roads in Ireland
 National primary road
 National secondary road

References 

Roads in County Monaghan
Regional roads in the Republic of Ireland